Shayde is a fictional character who appeared in the Doctor Who Magazine comic strip based on the long-running British science fiction television series Doctor Who.

Background and abilities
Shayde is an artificial being, a construct of the Gallifreyan Matrix — the massive computer network that serves as the repository of all Time Lord knowledge. He was created by the minds of the dead Time Lords that reside within the Matrix, and was a servant of Rassilon.

Among Shayde's powers are the abilities to travel through space and time unaided, fire deadly self-generated "psychic bullets" and be invisible to security systems. He can also phase through solid objects and track people through time and space given enough data.

Appearances in comics
He first appeared in the story The Tides of Time, published in DWM #61-#67, written by Steve Parkhouse and drawn by Dave Gibbons. In that story, he aided the Fifth Doctor in defeating the otherdimensional demon Melanicus, at first covertly but then, as the Time Lords increased his power levels, he was able to manifest himself and help the Doctor directly.

Shayde next appeared when the TARDIS was possessed by an Elemental being. Having no instructions from the Time Lords, Shayde was allowed to act on his own and helped the Doctor expel the entity from the TARDIS. When the Doctor was placed on trial by the Time Lords for allowing the possession to take place and possibly placing Gallifrey in danger, Shayde surreptitiously erased the evidence, leading to the Doctor's acquittal (The Stockbridge Horror, DWM #70-#75).

Shayde next appeared when the Doctor was in his Eighth incarnation and was dying due to the events of the previous adventure (Tooth and Claw, DWM #257-#260). His companions Izzy and Fey had taken him back to Gallifrey where he was cured and his mind placed within the Matrix to recover. While within the Matrix, an attempt was made on the Doctor's life by a secret Time Lord sect known as the Elysians, and Shayde stopped them.

However, this was a ruse. The Doctor had realised that Fey was under external control when she had managed to pilot the TARDIS even though the TARDIS manual was in Gallifreyan script, which she did not understand. Just before the Doctor prepared to sacrifice himself, Shayde offered to take his place and fake a regeneration. This way, the group that was controlling Fey — the Threshold, a mercenary organisation that the Doctor had tangled with before — would seize the opportunity to bring a newly regenerated and thus weaker Doctor to them. Both disguised with personal chameleon circuits, Shayde would hold their attention while the Doctor sabotaged the Threshold's operations.

In a Wild West town on an alien moon run by the Threshold, the Doctor's plans came to fruition. When Shayde and the Doctor revealed themselves to the Threshold, Shayde had to contend with the Pariah, an immensely powerful being who was his predecessor. The Pariah was another construct of Rassilon, but he had tried to destroy her when she developed free will and rebelled. Now, the Pariah wanted to take revenge, not just on Gallifrey but the whole universe. Shayde was unable to defeat the Pariah on his own, and she crushed his skull. However, Fey merged with the dying Shayde and together they were able to kill the Pariah and eliminate the Threshold. The shared being, dubbed "Feyde" by the Doctor, although both of them retained their own consciousness, decided to leave and deal with what had just happened to them (Wormwood, DWM #266-#271).

Fey returned to her own time period, the 1940s, where, as an agent of the British government, she spent two years fighting the Nazis and being frustrated that Shayde would not allow her to use their powers to kill Adolf Hitler, as this would change history. In 1941, she received a sub-ether summons from the Doctor — Izzy had been kidnapped, and the Doctor needed Shayde's abilities to track her whereabouts. Together, they succeeded in recovering Izzy, and "Feyde" returned to World War II.

Other media
Shayde is one of the few characters from the comic strip that has made the cross-over into the other spin-off media. In a special Big Finish Productions audio play given away with DWM #326 titled No Place Like Home, Shayde helped the Fifth Doctor against another force — a mutated Gallifreyan mouse called a  — that had infiltrated the TARDIS and was trying to kill the Doctor and his companions. The character of Shayde was voiced by Mark Donovan.

Comics characters introduced in 1982
Doctor Who comic strip characters
Doctor Who audio characters